AG – DMS metro station is a Metro railway station on the Blue Line of the Chennai Metro. The station is among the underground stations along corridor I of the Chennai Metro, Wimco Nagar–Chennai International Airport stretch. The station serves the neighbourhoods of Teynampet and T. Nagar.

Etymology
The station is named as AG – DMS because of the presence of the Accountant General's (AG) Office and the office of the Directorate of Medical and Rural Health Services (DMS) in the vicinity.

Construction

The station
The station has a length of 380 meters. It is one of the two stations in Phase I of Chennai Metro, the other being the Puratchi Thalaivar Dr. M.G. Ramachandran Central metro station, that measure a length of 380 meters or more. The station was opened for public on 25 May 2018.

Station layout

Facilities
List of available ATM at AAG – DMS metro station are

Connections

Bus
Metropolitan Transport Corporation (Chennai) bus routes number 1B, 11A, 11ACT, 11G, 11H, 13B, 18A, 18D, 18E, 18K, 18R, 23C, 23V, 29N, 41C, 41D, 41F, 51J, 51P, 52, 52B, 52K, 52P, 54, 54D, 54M, 60, 60A, 60D, 60H, 88Ccut, 88K, 88R, 118A, 188, 221, 221H, A51, B18, B29NGS, D51, E18, M51R, serves the station from nearby DMS bus stand.

Entry/Exit

See also

 Chennai
 Anna Salai
 List of Chennai metro stations
 Chennai Metro
 Railway stations in Chennai
 Chennai Mass Rapid Transit System
 Chennai Monorail
 Chennai Suburban Railway
 Chennai International Airport
 Transport in Chennai
 Urban rail transit in India
 List of metro systems

References

External links

 
 UrbanRail.Net – descriptions of all metro systems in the world, each with a schematic map showing all stations.

Chennai Metro stations
Railway stations in Chennai